Frederuna (or Frederonne, Fridarun;  or ; 887–917) was the queen consort of France by marriage to King Charles III of France.

She was born in Goslar, Hanover to Dietrich Theodorich von Ringelheim, Duke of Saxony and his wife Gisela of Lotharingia. She was the half-sister of Matilda of Ringelheim, who married Henry the Fowler, King of East Francia, Amalrada, Bia, and a brother, Beuve II, the Bishop of Châlons-sur-Marne, and the first wife of King Charles III of France, whom she married in 907. She bore Charles six daughters: Ermentrude, Gisela, Frederuna, Adelais, Rotrude and Hildegarde. Frederuna died in 917 and she was succeeded as queen consort by Eadgifu of England, a daughter of Edward the Elder in 919.

References

External links 
 

|-

Carolingian dynasty
Frankish queens consort
French queens consort
Repudiated queens
887 births
917 deaths
Burials at the Royal Abbey of Saint-Remi
9th-century French people
9th-century French women
10th-century French people
10th-century French women
Women from the Carolingian Empire